Bayard Taylor School is a historic elementary school located in the Hunting Park neighborhood of Philadelphia, Pennsylvania. It is part of the School District of Philadelphia. The building was designed by Henry deCourcy Richards and built in 1907–1908. It is a three-story, seven bay, brick building with a raised basement in the Colonial Revival / Late Gothic Revival-style. It features an ornate entrance pavilion, stone detailing, and a brick parapet. The school was named for poet and author Bayard Taylor (1825–1878).

The building was added to the National Register of Historic Places in 1988.

References

External links

Bayard Taylor Elementary School

School buildings on the National Register of Historic Places in Philadelphia
Colonial Revival architecture in Pennsylvania
Gothic Revival architecture in Pennsylvania
School buildings completed in 1908
Hunting Park, Philadelphia
1908 establishments in Pennsylvania
Elementary schools in Philadelphia
School District of Philadelphia